François Baby may refer to:
François Baby (businessman) (1733–1820), businessman and politician in Lower Canada
François Baby (legislative councillor) (1794–1864), seigneur, businessman, and legislative councillor in Lower Canada, son of the first
François Baby (politician) (1768–1852), political figure in Upper Canada, nephew of the first